{{DISPLAYTITLE:C2H6N2O}}
The molecular formula C2H6N2O (molar mass: 74.08 g/mol, exact mass: 74.0480 u) may refer to:

 Azoxymethane (AOM)
 Glycinamide
 N-Nitrosodimethylamine (NDMA), or DMN